Rosângela Martins Campos (born 30 March 1954), known professionally as  Rosi Campos, is a Brazilian actress.

Biography 
Campos was born in 1954 in Bragança Paulista. She graduated in Journalism at the Escola de Comunicações e Artes of the University of São Paulo (ECA). She worked for five years as press officer for record label Som Livre, before being an actress.

Filmography

Cinema

References

External links 
 

Actresses from São Paulo (state)
Brazilian television actresses
1954 births
Living people
People from Bragança Paulista